UBF may stand for:

UBTF, a transcription factor in molecular biology
Union for Future Benin
University Bible Fellowship